Munitoria Commando was a light infantry regiment of the South African Army. It formed part of the South African Army Infantry Formation as well as the South African Territorial Reserve.

History

Origin
Munitoria Commando was originally affiliated to Hercules Commando an industrial commando.

Operations

With the SADF
The unit remained a company-sized unit and was housed within the lines of Hercules Commando under command of Group 15.

By 1983 the unit was given authority to become a fully fledged unit in its own right and it assumed the role of a reaction unit for the Northern Transvaal Command. By then its HQ had moved to the old German School building in Skinner Street, Pretoria.

With the SANDF

Amalgamation
Over the years several commando units and regiments, such as Hillcrest, Munitoria, Regiments Pretorius as well as 2 Regiment Noord-Transvaal were amalgamated with Regiment Schanskop.

In December 2002, the name "Tshwane Regiment" was approved to be in line with the area where the Regiment is situated.

Disbandment
The remaining commando units Commando units not amalgamated were disbanded after a decision by South African President Thabo Mbeki to disband all Commando Units. The Commando system was phased out between 2003 and 2008 "because of the role it played in the apartheid era", according to the Minister of Safety and Security Charles Nqakula.

Leadership

Insignia

See also 

 South African Commando System

References

Infantry regiments of South Africa
South African Commando Units
Disbanded military units and formations in Pretoria